Stephen Oyebolaji Payne (born June 16, 1997) is an American soccer player who currently plays as a defender for USL League One side Forward Madison FC.

Career
Born in the Birmingham, Alabama, United States, Payne is of Nigerian descent. His father had a scholarship for college soccer at the University of Alabama in Huntsville, while his mother ran track at Alabama A&M University; he is the middle of three children with two sisters also playing soccer, Nigeria women's national team players Toni and Nicole Payne.

Payne played for four years at Lake Forest Academy and one year at UCLA Bruins in 2015 before traveling to Europe for trials. Passed over by several professional clubs in France and Italy, he was taken on by a fourth-division Portuguese club and eventually earned his way into the under-23 team of G.D. Estoril Praia.

After a season with their reserve team, Payne made his first team debut for Varzim S.C. during the 2018–19 LigaPro season. He played 19 total games, and scored the only goal of the match in the 88th minute at FC Porto B on 23 April 2019.

Payne signed for Portimonense S.C. prior to the 2019–20 Primeira Liga season, alongside teammate Jeferson.

On January 20, 2022, Payne returned to the United States by signing with USL League One club Richmond Kickers.

Payne signed with rival USL League One club Forward Madison FC prior to the 2023 season.

Career statistics

Notes

References

External links
Stephen Payne at ZeroZero

1997 births
Living people
American soccer players
American sportspeople of Nigerian descent
American expatriate soccer players
Association football midfielders
Liga Portugal 2 players
G.D. Estoril Praia players
Varzim S.C. players
Portimonense S.C. players
Richmond Kickers players
Forward Madison FC players
Expatriate footballers in Portugal
American expatriate sportspeople in Portugal
Soccer players from Alabama
Soccer players from Birmingham, Alabama
UCLA Bruins men's soccer players
C.D. Mafra players